Gonjo County, is a county of the Chamdo Prefecture in the east of the Tibet Autonomous Region, bordering Sichuan province to the east.

Town and townships

 Bolo Town
 Mindo Township
 Zêba Township
 Langmai Township
 Sêrdong Township
 Kêrri Township
 Bumgyê Township
 Awang Township
 Lhato Township
 Qangsum Township
 Lha'gyai Township 
 Gyanbê Township

Counties of Tibet
Chamdo